Piergiorgio Negrisolo (born 22 July 1950 in Viadana) is a retired Italian professional footballer who played as a midfielder.

Career
Born in Viadana, Lombardy, Negrisolo began playing football with Guastalla. He made his Serie A debut with Sampdoria in a 1–1 draw with Torino on 6 October 1968. He played for 12 seasons (256 games, 13 goals) in the Serie A for U.C. Sampdoria, A.S. Roma, Hellas Verona F.C. and Delfino Pescara 1936.

References

1950 births
Living people
Italian footballers
Serie A players
A.C. Reggiana 1919 players
U.C. Sampdoria players
A.S. Roma players
Hellas Verona F.C. players
Delfino Pescara 1936 players
Rimini F.C. 1912 players
U.S. Sassuolo Calcio players

Association football midfielders